The Main Place Tower is located at 350 Main Street, in Buffalo, New York. The skyscraper is the fourth-tallest building in the city, and home to many technology and communication firms. The tower, built in 1969, rises . The shopping center within the complex is referred to as the Main Place Mall.

History
The current location of the Main Place Tower was originally Shelton Square, a city block of considerable traffic in the city. Shelton Square was the site of a notorious publicity stunt in 1955, when disc jockey Tom Clay climbed to the top of a billboard in the square and disrupted traffic by repeatedly playing "Rock Around the Clock" by Bill Haley & His Comets on a loudspeaker; the incident led to Clay's firing and arrest.

Originally the headquarters for the Erie County Savings Bank, it became known as One Empire Tower when the Erie County Savings Bank became Empire of America, the building was then renamed "Main Place Tower" in the 1980s with the demise of Empire of America. The Main Place Tower was constructed as part of an urban renewal project. The land site of the building was previously home to the Richardsonian Romanesque castle-like Erie County Savings Bank Building (1890-1968). The Erie County Savings Bank was both the anchor tenant and financial backer for the Main Place tower construction and leased the first three floors upon its completion.

Jim Kelly owned and operated Sport City Grill restaurant with the attached Network nightclub on the ground floor of the complex from 1993 to 1996. New ownership tried to relaunch the restaurant as Banana Joe's Sports Bar & Grill in late 1996, but it went out of business in 1997.

As of 2020, the concourse at the base of the complex has several tenants, two restaurants and a food court. That year, the city announced plans to collaborate with Main Place's owner to make room for office and parking space.

Gallery

See also
 List of tallest buildings in Buffalo

External links
 Official website
 Skyscraperpage building page
 Emporis building page

References 

Office buildings completed in 1969
Skyscraper office buildings in Buffalo, New York
Harrison & Abramovitz buildings